General elections were held in Aruba on 23 September 2005. They were won by the People's Electoral Movement, which took 11 of the 21 seats in the Estates.

Results

Elections in Aruba
Aruba
2005 in Aruba